Fredrik Gunnarsson (born Hans Göte Fredrik Gunnarsson, September 4, 1965 in Oxelösund) is a Swedish actor.  He is best known for playing the character Svartman in a series of television films based on the Kurt Wallander novels by Henning Mankell.  He has also worked at the Malmö City Theatre and had a small cameo role in an episode of the British Wallander series.

References

External links

1965 births
Living people
People from Oxelösund Municipality
Swedish male television actors
Swedish male stage actors
20th-century Swedish male actors
21st-century Swedish male actors